van Straaten is a Dutch and Afrikaans surname. Notable people with the surname include:

Braam van Straaten (born 1971), South African rugby union player
Harmen van Straaten, Dutch author and illustrator
J. Keith van Straaten (born 1971), American actor and television host
Peter van Straaten, Dutch cartoonist
Werenfried van Straaten (1913–2003), Dutch Roman Catholic priest
Tess van Straaten, Canadian actor, television reporter/news anchor and magazine writer. 

Dutch-language surnames
Afrikaans-language surnames
Surnames of Dutch origin